P.V. Ramprasad Reddy is an Indian businessman and co-founder of Aurobindo Pharma. On the 2016 Forbes list of Indian billionaires, he was ranked No. 27 in India and No. 688 in world with a net worth of US$2.5 billion. The World Pharmaceutical Frontiers announced him one of the top thirty five influential people in the industry of pharmaceutical in 2008.

See also 
 Forbes list of Indian billionaires

References

Indian billionaires
Living people
Indian industrialists
Year of birth missing (living people)